Slipknot is an American heavy metal band from Des Moines, Iowa, formed in 1995. The band's first concert tour was of the United States with the 1999 Ozzfest, a festival founded in 1996 featuring live performances by heavy metal bands. After the Livin la Vida Loco tour, the band embarked in November 1999 on its first international circuit, the World Domination Tour. After being on the road for a year through North America, Europe, Japan, and Australia, the band briefly attended Tattoo the Earth, during which the band recorded the performance at Dynamo Open Air and later released it as part of the film 10 Years of Life Death Love Hate Pain Scars Victory War Blood and Destruction.

Slipknot's first headlining world tour was launched in May 2001, in support of its second studio album, Iowa. The band toured for almost 15 months, and included a performance at the London Arena which was filmed for Disasterpieces, as well as the 2001 Ozzfest.

The next world tour, The Subliminal Verses World Tour, lasted over 20 months and had over 230 concerts. The tour also brought about Slipknot's first official live album, 9.0: Live. During the tour, the band performed the song "Purity," which was taken off the 1999 debut album due to copyright infringement. Slipknot performed songs that are rarely played live, such as "Iowa" and "Get This", as well as the first live performance of "Skin Ticket".

The All Hope Is Gone World Tour came after the release of the fourth studio album, All Hope Is Gone, in 2008. The band toured in Israel, Luxembourg and several other countries where it had never performed in before. During the tour, the drummer Joey Jordison and the DJ Sid Wilson broke an ankle, and both ankles respectively. Most of Slipknot's concerts were performed with the following band members: Sid Wilson, Joey Jordison, Paul Gray, Chris Fehn, Jim Root, Craig Jones, Shawn Crahan, Mick Thomson, and Corey Taylor. However, some shows were performed a few members short, usually due to injuries.

Headlining tours

Other performances

References
Literature

General

 

Specific

External links
Slipknot official website
Slipknot at NME

 
Slipknot